Christopher Samuel Swan (4 December 1900–1979) was an English footballer who played in the Football League for Crystal Palace, Hull City, Newcastle United and Stockport County.

References

1900 births
1979 deaths
English footballers
Association football forwards
English Football League players
Newcastle United F.C. players
Stockport County F.C. players
Hull City A.F.C. players
Crystal Palace F.C. players
Waterford F.C. players
Scarborough F.C. players